The Titan: Story of Michelangelo is a 1950 German documentary film about the painter and sculptor Michelangelo. It won the Academy Award for Best Documentary Feature.

The film was a re-edited version of a German/Swiss film of 1938 originally titled Michelangelo: Life of a Titan, directed by Curt Oertel. The re-edited version featured a new English narration by Fredric March and a musical score onto a shorter edit of the existing film. The new credits include Richard Lyford as director and Robert Snyder as producer. The film was edited by Lyford. The Academy Film Archive preserved The Titan in 2005.

Cast
 Fredric March as himself/narrator

References

External links

The Titan: Story of Michelangelo at Masters & Masterworks Productions, founded by Robert Snyder

1950 films
1950 documentary films
German documentary films
Best Documentary Feature Academy Award winners
Black-and-white documentary films
Films directed by Robert Flaherty
Films directed by Richard Lyford
Documentary films about painters
Michelangelo
German black-and-white films
Alternative versions of films
1950s English-language films
1950s German films